NGC 3816 is a lenticular galaxy located about 270 million light-years away in the constellation Leo. It was discovered by astronomer Heinrich d'Arrest on May 9, 1864. NGC 3816 is a member of the Leo Cluster.

See also
 List of NGC objects (3001–4000)

References

External links
 

3816
36292
6656
Leo (constellation)
Leo Cluster
Lenticular galaxies
Astronomical objects discovered in 1864